Festus Oluwole Segun (born 20 March 1915) was a Nigerian Anglican bishop.

Segun was born in Ijebu Ode. He was educated at Our Saviour's Primary School in Ijebu Ode; St. Andrew's College in Oyo and Fourah Bay College, Sierra Leone.

Segun was ordained an Anglican deacon in 1951 and a priest in 1952. He held posts in Ebute Metta, Aroloya and Yaba. From 1956 to 1960 he studied at Union Theological Seminary in New York City before becoming a lecturer at St Augustine's College, Canterbury. On his return to Lagos he was appointed provost of the Cathedral Church of Christ, Lagos, a post he held until 1970 when he became Bishop of Northern Nigeria. In 1975 he was translated to Lagos, a role that he retired from in 1985. He was also involved in the foundation of the Christian Association of Nigeria.

References

1915 births
Possibly living people
People from Ijebu Ode
Fourah Bay College alumni
Union Theological Seminary (New York City) alumni
Academics of St Augustine's College, Canterbury
Anglican provosts of Lagos
Anglican bishops of Northern Nigeria
Anglican bishops of Lagos
Yoruba Christian clergy